South Sentinel Island is one of the Andaman Islands in the Bay of Bengal. At only , it is much smaller than its counterpart North Sentinel Island and is currently uninhabited. 
The island belongs to the Port Blair tehsil in the South Andaman administrative district, part of the Indian union territory of Andaman and Nicobar Islands, neighbouring North Sentinel Island.

Geography
From the limited information available it can be said that South Sentinel Island is a forested coral reef. From a journal written in the 19th century, a Colonel Alcock who passed the island wrote "[South Sentinel is] raised a few feet and continuous with the corals surrounding it".
It lies immediately south of the passage. 
The island is 44 m high to the tops of the trees and level topped. Its appearance is much the same on all bearings. Considerable depths exist in the channel between this island and Little Andaman Island.

Administration
Politically, South Sentinel Island is part of Little Andaman Taluk.

In 2018, the Government of India excluded 29 islands—including South Sentinel—from the Restricted Area Permit (RAP) regime until 31 December 2022 in an effort to boost tourism. In November 2018, however, the government's Home ministry stated that the relaxation of the prohibition was intended only to allow researchers and anthropologists, with pre-approved clearance, to visit the Sentinel islands.

Demographics 
The island is uninhabited but is sometimes used by diving expeditions on account of its remoteness and novelty factor.

Fauna
The South Sentinel Island Sanctuary (established in 1977) is home to coconut crabs, which have otherwise been extirpated from most of the Andamans aside from North Sentinel and Little Andaman. Huge numbers of pied imperial-pigeon (Ducula aenea) nest on the island; every March, thousands of them come from South and Little Andaman to nest on South Sentinel. Small numbers of Nicobar pigeon (Caloenas nicobarica) also nest on the island. One globally threatened bird, the Andaman crake (Rallina canningi) also occurs on the island. It is also a very important nesting habitat for the green sea turtle (Chelonia mydas); large "swarms" of turtles used to be seen in the past, but they have been significantly reduced following extensive poaching by trawlers. Small numbers of leatherback turtles (Dermochelys coriacea) also nest on the island. Two large reptile species are found on the island: the Andaman water monitor (Varanus salvator andamanensis) and the saltwater crocodile (Crocodylus porosus). The Andaman Islands day gecko (Phelsuma andamanense) is also found on the island. There are no terrestrial mammals on the island aside from the endemic Andaman horseshoe bat (Rhinolophus cognatus).

See also

 List of reefs

References

External links
 "A Journey to the Edge of the World", janakilenin.blogspot.com
 Geological Survey of India

Coral reefs
Islands of South Andaman district
Islands of the Bay of Bengal
Tourist attractions in the Andaman and Nicobar Islands
Uninhabited islands of India
Islands of India